Jorge Alberto Muñiz Gardner (born 1 May 1960) is a Mexican actor, comedian, singer, and host. He is better known by his nickname: "Coque".

Biography 
Coque was born in Ciudad de México to parents Marco Antonio Muñiz ("Mexico's Favorite Singer / Showman") and Olga Gardner Meza. When he was only ten years old, he sung in the choruses of Armando Manzanero. His professional singing career began while he was still an adolescent.

Discography 
 Serenata
 Serenata 2: Desvelo De Amor
 Serenata 3: Confidencias De Amor
 Las Canciones Que Mi Papa No Me Enseño
 Emociones
 Noche De Rondalla

Filmography 
Alegrías de Mediodía (1978–)... Conductor
Al Fin de Semana (1999–)... Conductor
Nuestra Casa (2003–2006)... Conductor
La escuelita VIP (2004–)... Coque
Cantando por un Sueño (2006–)... Participante
Yo amo a Juan Querendón (2007–)
¡Pedro Infante Vive! (2007)... Conductor
El Suertudo 2007... Conductor
TV de Noche (2007–)... Conductor
100 Mexicanos Dijieron (2009)... Celebridad Invitado
Una familia con suerte (2011)... Psicólogo (Episodios 1 y 2)
Adictos (2012)... (Adicto a las Gordas)
Libre para amarte (2013)... Benjamín Hernández Alpuche

External links 
 
 In Facebook
 In Twitter
 "La Otra Parte De Mi", In YouTube
 Mini Official Agent's Site

References 
Biografía de Jorge Muñiz en EsMas.com

Mexican male comedians
Mexican male singers
Mexican male telenovela actors
Mexican male television actors
Mexican male film actors
1960 births
Living people
Male actors from Mexico City
Singers from Mexico City